This article compares UML tools. UML tools are software applications which support some functions of the Unified Modeling Language.

General

Features

See also 

 List of requirements engineering tools

References

External links 

 .

 
Technical communication
Software comparisons
Diagramming software
Computing-related lists